The Dicționar moldovenesc-românesc ("Moldovan–Romanian dictionary") is a dictionary compiled by Vasile Stati and published in 2003 in Chișinău in Moldova. Being the first and only one of its kind, it contains 19,000 allegedly Moldovan (one of the two names for the Romanian language in Moldova) words that are explained in Romanian. Its publishing was followed by a wave of criticism both in the Republic of Moldova and Romania. Strongly challenged by the Moldovan historian community, the "Moldovan-Romanian Dictionary" is considered a nonsense by most linguists in Chișinău, being nothing more than a lexicon of archaisms and regionalisms specific to the Moldavian dialect of the Romanian language.

The idea of a dictionary might have come when the Romanian then-president, Ion Iliescu, said that he would believe that Moldovan is a different language from Romanian when he had a Moldovan–Romanian dictionary in his hands.

The dictionary includes:
 Supposed Moldovan words that are also common in Romanian;
 Regionalisms from Moldova, some of which are also used in the neighbouring Moldavia region in Romania as well;
 Archaic Romanian words from old documents that are no longer in use in Romania but some of which remain in use in Moldova;
 Russian words that at some point entered in the speech of Moldova, but are missing from Romanian.

References

External links
Un monument al minciunii și al urii – 'Dicționarul moldovenesc-românesc' al lui Vasile Stati in Contrafort magazine, no. 7-8 (105-106) / July–August 2003
"Se sparie gândul..." in 22 magazine, no. 704 / 2–8 September 2003

2003 non-fiction books
Moldovan language
Controversy over ethnic and linguistic identity in Moldova
Romanian dictionaries
Translation dictionaries